The Men's team sprint competition at the 2023 World Single Distances Speed Skating Championships was held on 2 March 2023.

Results
The race was started at 21:42.

References

Men's team sprint